Events in the year 2022 in the Central African Republic.

Incumbents 

 President: Faustin-Archange Touadéra
 Prime Minister: Félix Moloua

Monthly events 
Ongoing – COVID-19 pandemic in the Central African Republic, Central African Republic Civil War

 April 27 – The Central African Republic adopts bitcoin as legal tender, after its legislature unanimously approved the law.
 April 29 – Six soldiers and four Coalition of Patriots for Change rebels are killed during a shootout at a military outpost in Bakouma, Central African Republic.
 October 31 – A special court in the Central African Republic sentences three 3R militiamen to 20 years to life in prison for crimes against humanity, in what is considered a historic and first trial regarding the civil war.

See also 

COVID-19 pandemic in Africa
African Continental Free Trade Area
Community of Sahel–Saharan States

References 

 
2020s in the Central African Republic
Years of the 21st century in the Central African Republic
Central African Republic
Central African Republic